Satbir Singh may refer to:

 Satbir Singh (politician) (born 1954), mayor of Delhi
 Satbir Singh (field hockey) (born 1993), Indian field hockey player